Montechiaro could refer to:

 Montechiaro d'Asti - a town and comune in the Province of Asti, Italy
 Montechiaro d'Acqui - a town and comune in the Province of Alessandria, Italy
 Palma di Montechiaro - a town and comune of Sicily
The medieval  (castle of Montechiaro) in Rivergaro

See also
 Montichiari, a town and comune in the province of Brescia, Italy